This is a list of ambassadors of the United States and other Heads of Mission to Lebanon.
 George Wadsworth (1942–1947) – Consul General, later promoted to Envoy. Also was head of mission to Syria but resident in Beirut.
 Lowell C. Pinkerton (1946–1951) – Envoy
 Harold B. Minor (1951–1953) – Envoy, promoted to first ambassador.
 Raymond A. Hare (1953–1954)
 Donald R. Heath (1955–1958)
 Robert McClintock (1958–1961)
 Armin H. Meyer (1961–1965)
 Dwight J. Porter (1965–1970)
 William B. Buffum (1970–1974)
 G. McMurtrie Godley (1974–1976)
 Francis E. Meloy, Jr. (1976) – Assassinated prior to presenting credentials. 
 Richard B. Parker (1977–1978)
 John Gunther Dean (1978–1981)
 Robert Sherwood Dillon (1981–1983)
 Reginald Bartholomew (1983–1986)
 John Hubert Kelly (1986–1988)

On September 6, 1989, all United States personnel were withdrawn from Beirut during unrest resulting from there being no clear successor to President Amin Gemayel. Ambassador Ryan C. Crocker did not formally present his credentials until 1990 to Rene Moawad.

 John Thomas McCarthy (1988–1990)
 Ryan Clark Crocker (1990–1993)
 Mark Gregory Hambley (1993–1994)
 Vincent M. Battle (1994) – Charges d'Affaires ad interim.
 Ronald L. Schlicher (1994–1996) – Charges d'Affaires ad interim.
 Richard Henry Jones (1996–1998)
 David Michael Satterfield (1998–2001)
 Vincent M. Battle (2001–2004)
 Jeffrey D. Feltman (2004–2008)
 Michele J. Sison (2008–2010)
 Maura Connelly  (2010–2013)
 David Hale (2013–2015)
 Elizabeth Holzhall Richard (2016–2020)
 Dorothy Shea (2020–present)

See also
Lebanon – United States relations
Foreign relations of Lebanon
Ambassadors of the United States

References
United States Department of State: Background notes on Lebanon

External links
 United States Department of State: Chiefs of Mission for Lebanon
 United States Department of State: Lebanon
 United States Embassy in Beirut

Lebanon
 
United States